In the field of EMC, active EMI reduction (or active EMI filtering) refers to techniques aimed to reduce or to filter electromagnetic noise (EMI) making use of active electronic components. Active EMI reduction contrasts with passive filtering techniques, such as RC filters, LC filters RLC filters, which includes only passive electrical components. Hybrid solutions including both active and passive elements exist. 
Standards concerning conducted and radiated emissions published by IEC 
and FCC 
set the maximum noise level allowed for different classes of electrical devices. The frequency range of interest spans from 150 kHz to 30 MHz for conducted emissions and from 30 MHz to 40 GHz for radiated emissions. Meeting these requirements and guaranteeing the functionality of an electrical apparatus subject to electromagnetic interference are the main reason to include an EMI filter. In an electrical system, power converters, i.e. DC/DC converters, inverters and rectifiers, are the major sources of conducted EMI, due to their high-frequency switching ratio which gives rise to unwanted fast current and voltage transients. Since power electronics is nowadays spread in many fields, from power industrial application to automotive industry, EMI filtering has become necessary. In other fields, such as the telecommunication industry where the major focus is on radiated emissions, other techniques have been developed for EMI reduction, such as spread spectrum clocking which makes use of digital electronics, or electromagnetic shielding.

Working principle 
The concept behind active EMI reduction has already been implemented previously in acoustics with the active noise control and it can be described considering the following three different blocks:

Sensing stage: the undesired EMI noise, which can be treated either as a high-frequency current superimposed on the functional current or as a voltage, is sensed and sent to the electronic stage. The sensor could be a current transformer to register currents or a capacitive branch to sense voltages. The detected signal should be an exact copy of the noise, both in magnitude and phase.
Electronic stage: the recorded signal is amplified and inverted exploiting electronics. Analog devices, e.g. OpAmps and InAmps in different configurations or transistors, are used. For conducted emission frequencies, high gain and wide bandwidth can be achieved with many available devices. This electronic block requires an external power supply.
Injecting stage: the elaborated signal is eventually injected back into the system with opposite phase in order to achieve the noise reduction or cancellation. Currents can be injected using a capacitive branch, while voltages can be induced with a series transformer.

The active EMI reduction device should not affect the normal operation of the raw system.

Filter topologies
The EMI noise can be categorized as common mode (CM) and differential mode (DM).
Depending on the noise component that should be compensated, different topologies and configurations are possible. Two families of active filter exist, the feedback and the feed forward controlled: the first detects the noise  at  the  receiver  and generates a compensation signal to suppress the noise; the latter detects the noise  at  the  noise  source  and  generates  an  opposite signal to cancel out the noise.

Even though the spectrum of an EMI noise is composed by several spectral components, a single frequency at the time is taken into account to make possible a simple circuit representation, as shown in Fig. 1. The noise source  is represented as a sinusoidal source with its Norton representation which delivers a sinusoidal current  to the load impedance .

The nullator is  an  element  whose  voltage  and  current  are  always zero, while the norator is an element whose voltage and current can assume any value. 
Then  the norator must  be  placed  to  satisfy  the  Kirchhoff's current and voltage   laws (KVL and KCL). The active EMI filter always  tries to  keep  a constant value of current or voltage at the load, in this specific case this value is equal to zero. The combination of a nullator and a norator forms a nullor, which is an  element that can be represented by an ideal controlled voltage/current source.

The series  and  parallel  combinations  of  Norator and Nullator  gives  four  possible  configurations  of  ideal  controlled sources which, for the case of feedback topology, are shown in Fig. 2 and in Fig. 3 for the feedback topology.

The four implementation that can be actualized are:

 Current sensing - Current injecting (current controlled current source)
 Voltage sensing - Current injecting (voltage controlled current source)
 Current sensing - Voltage injecting (current controlled voltage source)
 Voltage sensing - Voltage injecting (voltage controlled voltage source)

Feedback

To assess the performances and the effectiveness of the filter, the Insertion loss (IL) can be evaluated in each case. The IL, expressed in dB, represents the achievable noise attenuation and it is defined as:

By applying KVL, KCL and Ohm's law to the circuit, these two voltages can be calculated.
If  is the filter's gain, i.e. the transfer function between the sensed and the injected signal, IL results to be:

Larger IL implies a greater attenuation, while a smaller than unity IL implies an undesired noise signal amplification caused by the active filter. In these two cases ILs can be approximated to:

On the other hand, in  the  type (c) (current sensing and voltage compensation) active filter, the gain of the active filter should be larger than  the  total  impedance of the given system to obtain the maximum IL. This means that the filter should provide a high series impedance between the noise source and the receiver to block the noise current. Similar conclusion can be made for a type (b) (voltage detecting and current compensating) active filter; the equivalent admittance of the active filter should be much higher than the  total admittance of the system without the filter, so that the active filter reroutes the noise current   and minimizes the noise voltage at the receiver port. In this way, active filters try to block and divert the noise propagation path as conventional passive LC filters do.

Feed forward

While feedback filters register the noise at load side and inject the compensation signal at source side, the feed forward devices do the opposite: the sensing is at source end and the compensation at load port. For this reason, there cannot be feedforward-type implementation for type (b) and (c). Type (a) (current sensing and injecting) and type (d) (voltage sensing and injecting) can be implemented and the calculated ILs result to be:

Considering also in these two cases the condition for maximum noise reduction, i.e. maximum IL, it can be achieved when the filter's gain is equal to one. If , it follows that . It can also be noted that, if or, generally speaking, the insertion loss becomes negative and thus the active filter amplifies the noise instead of reducing it.

Active vs passive 

 EMI passive filter performances depend upon the impedances of the surrounding electrical system, while, in some configurations, it does not happen for active filtering.
 Active filters requires an external power supply for their internal circuitry.
 Active filters have to deal with the stability of the electronic components.
 As the functional current and voltage of a system increase, passive components increase in size and price. This issue does not affect active filters since they deal only with the detected high-frequency small signal.

See also 

 Passive filter
 Electromagnetic compatibility
 Electromagnetic interference

References

Electromagnetic compatibility